Malik Bouziane (born January 11, 1978) is an Algerian former professional boxer. As an amateur, he competed at the 2004 Summer Olympics.

Career
Bouziane participated in the 2004 Summer Olympics for his native North African country. There, he was stopped in the second round of the bantamweight (54 kg) division by Russia's Gennady Kovalev.

Bouziane won the gold medal in the same division one year earlier, at the All-Africa Games in Abuja, Nigeria. He was a member of the team that competed for Africa at the 2005 Boxing World Cup in Moscow, Russia.

Personal life
Bouziane is originally from the village of Taourirt Adene in the Tizi Ouzou Province in the Kabylie region of Algeria.

Professional boxing record

| style="text-align:center;" colspan="8"|15 Wins (2 knockouts, 13 decisions), 1 Loss (0 knockouts, 1 decision), 1 Draw
|-  style="text-align:center; background:#e3e3e3;"
|  style="border-style:none none solid solid; "|Res.
|  style="border-style:none none solid solid; "|Record
|  style="border-style:none none solid solid; "|Opponent
|  style="border-style:none none solid solid; "|Type
|  style="border-style:none none solid solid; "|Rd., Time
|  style="border-style:none none solid solid; "|Date
|  style="border-style:none none solid solid; "|Location
|  style="border-style:none none solid solid; "|Notes
|- align=center
|Win
|align=center|15-1-1||align=left| Genilson de Jesus Santos
|
|
|
|align=left|
|align=left|
|- align=center
|Win
|align=center|14-1-1||align=left| Levan Garibashvili
|
|
|
|align=left|
|align=left|
|- align=center
|Draw
|align=center|13-1-1||align=left| Simphiwe Nongqayi
|
|
|
|align=left|
|align=left|
|- align=center
|Win
|align=center|13-1||align=left| Emiliano Salvini
|
|
|
|align=left|
|align=left|
|- align=center
|Win
|align=center|12-1||align=left| Carmelo Ballone
|
|
|
|align=left|
|align=left|
|- align=center
|Win
|align=center|11-1||align=left| Ian Napa
|
|
|
|align=left|
|align=left|
|- align=center
|Win
|align=center|10-1||align=left| Cristian Niculae
|
|
|
|align=left|
|align=left|
|- align=center
|Loss
|align=center|9-1||align=left| Mohamed Bouleghcha
|
|
|
|align=left|
|align=left|
|- align=center
|Win
|align=center|9-0||align=left| Jorge Perez
|
|
|
|align=left|
|align=left|
|- align=center
|Win
|align=center|8-0||align=left| Alix Djavoiev
|
|
|
|align=left|
|align=left|
|- align=center
|Win
|align=center|7-0||align=left| Jean-Marie Codet
|
|
|
|align=left|
|align=left|
|- align=center
|Win
|align=center|6-0||align=left| John Bikai
|
|
|
|align=left|
|align=left|
|- align=center
|Win
|align=center|5-0||align=left| Cherif Saki
|
|
|
|align=left|
|align=left|
|- align=center
|Win
|align=center|4-0||align=left| Nordine Barmou
|
|
|
|align=left|
|align=left|
|- align=center
|Win
|align=center|3-0||align=left| Cristian Mihai
|
|
|
|align=left|
|align=left|
|- align=center
|Win
|align=center|2-0||align=left| Walid Abderrahmen
|
|
|
|align=left|
|align=left|
|- align=center
|Win
|align=center|1-0||align=left| Omar Oubaali
|
|
|
|align=left|
|align=left|
|- align=center

References

External links
 
sports-reference

1978 births
Living people
Kabyle people
Bantamweight boxers
Boxers at the 2004 Summer Olympics
Olympic boxers of Algeria
Algerian male boxers
European Boxing Union champions
African Games gold medalists for Algeria
African Games medalists in boxing
Competitors at the 2003 All-Africa Games
21st-century Algerian people
20th-century Algerian people